In the mathematical discipline of graph theory, the line graph of an undirected graph  is another graph   that represents the adjacencies between edges of .   is constructed in the following way: for each edge in , make a vertex in  ; for every two edges in  that have a vertex in common, make an edge between their corresponding vertices in  .

The name line graph comes from a paper by  although both  and  used the construction before this. Other terms used for the line graph include the covering graph, the derivative, the edge-to-vertex dual, the conjugate, the representative graph, and the θ-obrazom, as well as the edge graph, the interchange graph, the adjoint graph, and the derived graph.

 proved that with one exceptional case the structure of a connected graph  can be recovered completely from its line graph. Many other properties of line graphs follow by translating the properties of the underlying graph from vertices into edges, and by Whitney's theorem the same translation can also be done in the other direction. Line graphs are claw-free, and the line graphs of bipartite graphs are perfect. Line graphs are characterized by nine forbidden subgraphs and can be recognized in linear time.

Various extensions of the concept of a line graph have been studied, including line graphs of line graphs, line graphs of multigraphs, line graphs of hypergraphs, and line graphs of weighted graphs.

Formal definition
Given a graph , its line graph  is a graph such that

Example 

The following figures show a graph (left, with blue vertices) and its line graph (right, with green vertices). Each vertex of the line graph is shown labeled with the pair of endpoints of the corresponding edge in the original graph. For instance, the green vertex on the right labeled 1,3 corresponds to the edge on the left between the blue vertices 1 and 3. Green vertex 1,3 is adjacent to three other green vertices: 1,4 and 1,2 (corresponding to edges sharing the endpoint 1 in the blue graph) and 4,3 (corresponding to an edge sharing the endpoint 3 in the blue graph).

Properties

Translated properties of the underlying graph
Properties of a graph  that depend only on adjacency between edges may be translated into equivalent properties in  that depend on adjacency between vertices.

Thus,
 The line graph of a connected graph is connected. However, a graph  that has some isolated vertices, and is therefore disconnected, may nevertheless have a connected line graph.
 A line graph has an articulation point if and only if the underlying graph has a bridge for which neither endpoint has degree one.
Since maximum matchings may be found in polynomial time, so may the maximum independent sets of line graphs, despite the hardness of the maximum independent set problem for more general families of graphs.
 The edge chromatic number of a graph  is equal to the vertex chromatic number of its line graph .
 The line graph of an edge-transitive graph is vertex-transitive. This property can be used to generate families of graphs that (like the Petersen graph) are vertex-transitive but are not Cayley graphs: if  is an edge-transitive graph that has at least five vertices, is not bipartite, and has odd vertex degrees, then  is a vertex-transitive non-Cayley graph.
However, not all Hamiltonian cycles in line graphs come from Euler cycles in this way; for instance, the line graph of a Hamiltonian graph  is itself Hamiltonian, regardless of whether  is also Eulerian.
 If two simple graphs are isomorphic then their line graphs are also isomorphic. The Whitney graph isomorphism theorem provides a converse to this for all but one pair of graphs.
 In the context of complex network theory, the line graph of a random network preserves many of the properties of the network such as the small-world property (the existence of short paths between all pairs of vertices) and the shape of its degree distribution.  observe that any method for finding vertex clusters in a complex network can be applied to the line graph and used to cluster its edges instead.

Whitney isomorphism theorem

If the line graphs of two connected graphs are isomorphic, then the underlying graphs are isomorphic, except in the case of the triangle graph  and the claw , which have isomorphic line graphs but are not themselves isomorphic.

For instance, the diamond graph  (two triangles sharing an edge) has four graph automorphisms but its line graph  has eight. In the illustration of the diamond graph shown, rotating the graph by 90 degrees is not a symmetry of the graph, but is a symmetry of its line graph. However, all such exceptional cases have at most four vertices. A strengthened version of the Whitney isomorphism theorem states that, for connected graphs with more than four vertices, there is a one-to-one correspondence between isomorphisms of the graphs and isomorphisms of their line graphs.

Analogues of the Whitney isomorphism theorem have been proven for the line graphs of multigraphs, but are more complicated in this case.

Strongly regular and perfect line graphs

The line graph of the complete graph  is also known as the triangular graph, the Johnson graph , or the complement of the Kneser graph . They may also be characterized (again with the exception of ) as the strongly regular graphs with parameters .

The line graph of a bipartite graph is perfect (see Kőnig's theorem), but need not be bipartite as the example of the claw graph shows. The line graphs of bipartite graphs form one of the key building blocks of perfect graphs, used in the proof of the strong perfect graph theorem. A special case of these graphs are the rook's graphs, line graphs of complete bipartite graphs. Like the line graphs of complete graphs, they can be characterized with one exception by their numbers of vertices, numbers of edges, and number of shared neighbors for adjacent and non-adjacent points. When both sides of the bipartition have the same number of vertices, these graphs are again strongly regular.

More generally, a graph  is said to be a line perfect graph if  is a perfect graph. The line perfect graphs are exactly the graphs that do not contain a simple cycle of odd length greater than three. Every line perfect graph is itself perfect.

Other related graph families
All line graphs are claw-free graphs, graphs without an induced subgraph in the form of a three-leaf tree. As with claw-free graphs more generally, every connected line graph  with an even number of edges has a perfect matching; equivalently, this means that if the underlying graph  has an even number of edges, its edges can be partitioned into two-edge paths.

The line graphs of trees are exactly the claw-free block graphs. These graphs have been used to solve a problem in extremal graph theory, of constructing a graph with a given number of edges and vertices whose largest tree induced as a subgraph is as small as possible.

All eigenvalues of the adjacency matrix  of a line graph are at least −2. In particular,  is the Gramian matrix of a system of vectors: all graphs with this property have been called generalized line graphs.

Characterization and recognition

Clique partition

Each vertex of  belongs to exactly two of them (the two cliques corresponding to the two endpoints of the corresponding edge in ).

By the strong version of Whitney's isomorphism theorem, if the underlying graph  has more than four vertices, there can be only one partition of this type.

For example, this characterization can be used to show that the following graph is not a line graph:

In this example, the edges going upward, to the left, and to the right from the central degree-four vertex do not have any cliques in common. Therefore, any partition of the graph's edges into cliques would have to have at least one clique for each of these three edges, and these three cliques would all intersect in that central vertex, violating the requirement that each vertex appear in exactly two cliques. Thus, the graph shown is not a line graph.

Forbidden subgraphs

He showed that there are nine minimal graphs that are not line graphs, such that any graph that is not a line graph has one of these nine graphs as an induced subgraph. That is, a graph is a line graph if and only if no subset of its vertices induces one of these nine graphs. In the example above, the four topmost vertices induce a claw (that is, a complete bipartite graph ), shown on the top left of the illustration of forbidden subgraphs. Therefore, by Beineke's characterization, this example cannot be a line graph. For graphs with minimum degree at least 5, only the six subgraphs in the left and right columns of the figure are needed in the characterization.

Algorithms
 and  described linear time algorithms for recognizing line graphs and reconstructing their original graphs.  generalized these methods to directed graphs.  described an efficient data structure for maintaining a dynamic graph, subject to vertex insertions and deletions, and maintaining a representation of the input as a line graph (when it exists) in time proportional to the number of changed edges at each step.

However, the algorithm of  uses only Whitney's isomorphism theorem. It is complicated by the need to recognize deletions that cause the remaining graph to become a line graph, but when specialized to the static recognition problem only insertions need to be performed, and the algorithm performs the following steps:
Construct the input graph  by adding vertices one at a time, at each step choosing a vertex to add that is adjacent to at least one previously-added vertex.
When adding a vertex  to a graph  for which  has four or fewer vertices, it might be the case that  the line graph representation is not unique. But in this case, the augmented graph is small enough that a representation of it as a line graph can be found by a brute force search in constant time.
Check that  has a vertex cover consisting of one vertex or two non-adjacent vertices. If there are two vertices in the cover, augment  by adding an edge (corresponding to ) that connects these two vertices.
Thus, the total time for the whole algorithm is proportional to the sum of the numbers of neighbors of all vertices, which (by the handshaking lemma) is proportional to the number of input edges.

Iterating the line graph operator
 consider the sequence of graphs

They show that, when  is a finite connected graph, only four behaviors are possible for this sequence:
If  is a cycle graph then  and each subsequent graph in this sequence are isomorphic to  itself.
If  is a claw , then  and all subsequent graphs in the sequence are triangles.
If  is a path graph then each subsequent graph in the sequence is a shorter path until eventually the sequence terminates with an empty graph.
In all remaining cases, the sizes of the graphs in this sequence eventually increase without bound.

For connected graphs that are not paths, all sufficiently high numbers of iteration of the line graph operation produce graphs that are Hamiltonian.

Generalizations

Medial graphs and convex polyhedra 

However, there exist planar graphs with higher degree whose line graphs are nonplanar. These include, for example, the 5-star , the gem graph formed by adding two non-crossing diagonals within a regular pentagon, and all convex polyhedra with a vertex of degree four or more.

An alternative construction, the medial graph, coincides with the line graph for planar graphs with maximum degree three, but is always planar. It has the same vertices as the line graph, but potentially fewer edges: two vertices of the medial graph are adjacent if and only if the corresponding two edges are consecutive on some face of the planar embedding. The medial graph of the dual graph of a plane graph is the same as the medial graph of the original plane graph.

For regular polyhedra or simple polyhedra, the medial graph operation can be represented geometrically by the operation of cutting off each vertex of the polyhedron by a plane through the midpoints of all its incident edges. This operation is known variously as the second truncation, degenerate truncation, or rectification.

Total graphs

Multigraphs
The concept of the line graph of  may naturally be extended to the case where  is a multigraph. In this case, the characterizations of these graphs can be simplified: the characterization in terms of clique partitions no longer needs to prevent two vertices from belonging to the same to cliques, and the characterization by forbidden graphs has seven forbidden graphs instead of nine.

However, for multigraphs, there are larger numbers of pairs of non-isomorphic graphs that have the same line graphs. For instance a complete bipartite graph  has the same line graph as the dipole graph and Shannon multigraph with the same number of edges. Nevertheless, analogues to Whitney's isomorphism theorem can still be derived in this case.

Line digraphs

It is also possible to generalize line graphs to directed graphs. The de Bruijn graphs may be formed by repeating this process of forming directed line graphs, starting from a complete directed graph.

Weighted line graphs
In a line graph , each vertex of degree  in the original graph  creates  edges in the line graph. For instance, consider a random walk on the vertices of the original graph . This will pass along some edge  with some frequency . On the other hand, this edge  is mapped to a unique vertex, say , in the line graph . Put another way, the Whitney graph isomorphism theorem guarantees that the line graph almost always encodes the topology of the original graph  faithfully but it does not guarantee that dynamics on these two graphs have a simple relationship. One solution is to construct a weighted line graph, that is, a line graph with weighted edges. There are several natural ways to do this. It is straightforward to extend this definition of a weighted line graph to cases where the original graph  was directed or even weighted. The principle in all cases is to ensure the line graph  reflects the dynamics as well as the topology of the original graph .

Line graphs of hypergraphs

The edges of a hypergraph may form an arbitrary family of sets, so the line graph of a hypergraph is the same as the intersection graph of the sets from the family.

Disjointness graph 

Notes

References 

.
.
.
.
.
.
.
.
.
.
.
.
.
.
.
.
.
.
.
.
.
.
.
.
.
.

External links 
Line graphs, Information System on Graph Class Inclusions

Graph families
Intersection classes of graphs
Graph operations